The 2016 United States Senate election in New York was held November 8, 2016, to elect a member of the United States Senate to represent the State of New York, concurrently with the presidential election, as well as other elections to the United States Senate in other states and elections to the United States House of Representatives and various state and local elections. The primaries took place on June 28.

Incumbent Democratic Senator Chuck Schumer won re-election to a fourth term in office. This was considered by many polling aggregate groups to be one of the safest Democratic seats in the nation for this cycle. The prediction turned out to be correct, with Schumer winning around 71% of the vote and all but 5 of the state's 62 counties: Hamilton, Orleans, Wyoming, Allegany and Steuben.

As of 2022, this is the last election where Jefferson, Oswego, Delaware, Schoharie, Herkimer, Genesee, Wayne, Livingston, Yates, Schuyler, Chemung, Tioga, Lewis and Chenango counties voted Democratic.

Democratic primary

Candidates

Declared 
 Chuck Schumer, incumbent U.S. Senator

Republican primary

Candidates

Declared 
 Wendy Long, attorney and nominee for the U.S. Senate in 2012

Declined 
 Richard L. Hanna, U.S. Representative
 Larry Kudlow, economist, television personality and columnist
 Adele Malpass, Chairwoman of the Manhattan Republican Party and wife of 2010 Senate candidate David Malpass

Third-party and independent candidates

Libertarian Party 
 Alex Merced, activist

Green Party 
 Robin Laverne Wilson

Conservative Party 
 Wendy Long, attorney and nominee for the U.S. Senate in 2012

General election

Debates

Endorsements

Predictions

Polling

Results

References

External links 
Official campaign websites
 Chuck Schumer (D) for Senate 
 Wendy Long (R) for Senate
 Alex Merced (L) for Senate
 Robin Laverne Wilson (G) for Senate

Senate
New York
2016